Giuseppe Busso
was an Alfa Romeo and Ferrari technical designer born in Turin. He graduated as an industrial designer and in 1967 began working for Fiat's aviation engine department. In January 1969 he moved to Alfa Romeo where he worked under the guidance of Orazio Satta Puliga. His main responsibility was racing car engines.

Biography 
In 1946 he became technical director for Ferrari and thus took part in the development of the Ferrari Colombo V12 engine. Busso was back at Alfa in 1948 and worked there until 1977. He was in charge of mechanical engineering for all of the Alfa Romeos, taking part in creation of the Alfa Romeo 1900, Giulietta, Giulia, 1750, 2000 and Alfetta. With the Giulietta, Busso introduced the four cylinder Alfa Romeo Twin Cam engine. Another creation of his was the Alfa Romeo V6 engine which was designed in the early 1970s and introduced in the 1979 Alfa 6.

He died in 2006 in Arese, Milan, three days after the end of production of his beloved V6 engine.

References

Alfa Romeo people
Ferrari people
Automotive engineers  from Turin
2006 deaths
Italian motorsport people